The Royal New Zealand Institute of Horticulture (RNZIH) is a horticultural society in New Zealand.

History 
According to its website, the RNZIH was founded in 1923. New Zealand's National Library holds minute books from the Institute dating back to 1924.

The RNZIH is only National Horticultural Society.

Purpose and activities 
Their mission is to "Encourage and improve horticulture in New Zealand by promoting the understanding, appreciation, conservation and use of plants".

New Zealand Gardens Trust
The New Zealand Gardens Trust (NZGT) is an organisation set up in 2004 by the Royal New Zealand Institute of Horticulture. According to its website, the NZGT "promotes the best in New Zealand gardens and horticulture" and runs a system to assess gardens that the public can visit and provide visitors with information on those gardens.

Gardens in the NZGT register are rated out of four levels, ranging from three stars to six stars. A six star rating indicates that "these gardens provide New Zealand’s top garden experiences. These gardens achieve and maintain the highest levels of presentation, design and plant interest throughout the year." As of 2019, sixteen gardens have received six stars, including Ayrlies Garden (Auckland), Otari-Wilton's Bush Native Botanic Garden (Wellington), Larnach Castle Garden (Dunedin), and Te Kainga Marire (New Plymouth).

See also
Gardening in New Zealand

References

External links
Home page

Scientific organisations based in New Zealand
Horticultural organizations
Gardening in New Zealand
Organizations established in 2004
Horticulture in New Zealand
Organisations based in New Zealand with royal patronage